Sharikat Naft Al-Basra, known as BPC for short, was an Iraqi football team based in Basra. They became Iraq's first ever national cup winners when they won the 1948–49 Iraq FA Cup that was played between teams from across the country. They competed regularly in the Iraq FA Basra League, a regional league for teams in Basra, winning the title in 1949–50 and 1950–51, finishing as runners-up in 1948–49 and finishing third in 1962–63 season. The team was dissolved in 1968.

Honours

Major

Minor
Asfar Knockout Cup:
Winners (2): 1946–47, 1947–48
Runners-up (1): 1948–49
Ministry of Oil Cup
Winners (1): 1961–62
Industries Exhibition Cup
Winners (1): 1953–54
Al-Minaa Cup
Winners (1): 1949–50
Al-Shamkhany Cup:
Winners (1): 1949–50
Runners-up (1): 1947–48
Regent's Cup:
Winners (1): 1948–49
Runners-up (1): 1949–50
Hanna Al-Sheikh Cup
Winners (1): 1948–49
I.P.C. and Associated Companies Challenge Cup
Runners-up (1): 1956–57

Notable players

 Saeed Easho
 Shaker Ismail
 Percy Lynsdale

References

Football clubs in Iraq
Football clubs in Basra
Basra
Works association football teams
Defunct football clubs in Iraq